Nataliya Anatoliïvna Samorodina (born March 17, 1983) is a Ukrainian former swimmer, who specialized in butterfly events and open water marathon. She represented Ukraine in two editions of the Olympic Games (2004 and 2008) and also swam for Ukraïna Zaporizhzhia.

Samorodina made her first Ukrainian team at the 2004 Summer Olympics in Athens, where she competed in the women's 200 m butterfly. Swimming in heat one, she put up a sprint race with neighboring Russia's Maria Bulakhova and Chinese Taipei's Cheng Wan-jung on the final lap, but could not catch them by almost a full-body length to finish third and twenty-seventh overall in 2:17.15.

At the 2008 Summer Olympics in Beijing, Samorodina shifted her focus from the pool to the open water surface, competing in the inaugural women's 10 km marathon. Leading up to the Games, she placed fourth in the 10 km Marathon Swimming Olympic test event at Shunyi Olympic Rowing-Canoeing Park. Swimming against a field of twenty-four, including South African amputee Natalie du Toit, British duo Keri-Anne Payne and Cassandra Patten, and sixteen-year-old American Chloe Sutton, Samorodina finished the grueling race in twenty-third position with a total time of 2:10:41.6, eleven minutes and thirteen seconds (11:13) behind winner Larisa Ilchenko of Russia.

References

External links
NBC Olympics Profile

1983 births
Living people
Ukrainian female swimmers
Olympic swimmers of Ukraine
Swimmers at the 2004 Summer Olympics
Swimmers at the 2008 Summer Olympics
Female butterfly swimmers
Female long-distance swimmers
Sportspeople from Zaporizhzhia